Group D of the 1999 FIFA Women's World Cup took place from June 19 to 26, 1999. The group consisted of Australia, China PR, Ghana and Sweden.

Standings

Matches
All times listed are local time.

China PR vs Sweden

Australia vs Ghana

Australia vs Sweden

China PR vs Ghana

China PR vs Australia

Ghana vs Sweden

References

External links
FIFA Women's World Cup USA 1999 at FIFA.com

1999 FIFA Women's World Cup
Australia at the 1999 FIFA Women's World Cup
China at the 1999 FIFA Women's World Cup
Ghana at the 1999 FIFA Women's World Cup
Sweden at the 1999 FIFA Women's World Cup